Dimity is a collective term for figured cloths of harness loom decorated with designs and patterns. It is a strong cotton cloth with various stripes and illustrations. It is bleached or washed after looming, less often dyed, unlike fustian, which is usually dyed.

It is a lightweight, sheer cotton fabric, used historically, having at least two warp threads thrown into relief to form fine cords. It is a cloth commonly employed for bed upholstery and curtains, and usually white, though sometimes a pattern is printed on it in colors. It is stout in texture, and woven in raised patterns. Originally dimity was made of silk or wool, but since the 18th century it has been woven almost exclusively of cotton.

Types 
Diaper is another kind of Dimity made of linen and sometimes cotton as well. It is a twill weave structure with diamond patterns. 

A palampore is a dimity made in India and used for bed coverings.

Name
Dimity is also a girls' name, which, while still uncommon, is most popular in Australia.

Article of clothing
A dimity is a bit of draping worn by performers of the Poses Plastiques, which was an early form of strip tease.  Performers wore flesh colored silk body stockings and a dimity to give the illusion of modesty.

Theatrical references
 In the Finale of Act I of The Pirates of Penzance, the Pirates sing, "Pray observe the magnanimity we display to lace and dimity".
 At the conclusion of The Insect Play, by brothers Karel and Josef Čapek and translated by Paul Selver, a group of school children sing: "As I went down to Shrewsbury Town, / I saw my love in a dimity gown: / And all so gay I gave it away, / I gave it away—my silver crown."

References

Woven fabrics